A batsman has scored 1,000 first-class runs before the end of May in an English cricket season on only eight occasions. In five of these occasions, the batsman reached 1,000 runs with innings played in April and May, but three scored 1,000 runs in the month of May alone. These were: W.G. Grace in 1895, Wally Hammond in 1927, and most recently Charlie Hallows in 1928.

Donald Bradman is the only person to have scored 1,000 runs before the end of May twice, in 1930 and 1938. Uniquely, a second batsman also reached 1,000 runs before the end of May in 1938, Bill Edrich, mainly thanks to a sporting declaration by Australia at 5.09pm on the third and final day of the match against Middlesex at Lord's on 28–30 May, when Edrich needed another 10 runs.

The rarely-achieved feat has become even more scarce since the Second World War, with only Glenn Turner and Graeme Hick reaching 1,000 runs before the end of May since 1938. In part, this is due to the reduced schedule of first-class cricket since the introduction of domestic one-day cricket competitions in the 1970s, and a corresponding reduction in the number of first-class matches played by English county teams and touring international teams. Hick, the last player to complete 1,000 first-class runs before the end of May, completed the bulk of the runs in three innings: 212 against Lancashire, 405 not out against Somerset, and 172 against the touring West Indies. He started this last innings, his last of the month, needing 153 to reach the target.

The start of the English cricket season has crept earlier in April in recent years, and Nick Compton came close to achieving 1,000 runs before the end of May 2012, needing 59 runs on 31 May against Worcestershire. Rain intervened with Compton having only scored nine, but he scored a century after resuming his innings the following day to pass 1,000 runs on 1 June. Other near misses include John Langridge who reached 1,000 runs on 2 June 1949, and Brian Lara, who reached 1,000 runs on 2 June 1994 from just seven innings.

Coincidentally, exactly ten years later, Ben Compton, the cousin of Nick, also narrowly missed out on the milestone formerly achieved by their grandfather Denis' long-time England and Middlesex team-mate Bill Edrich.  In 2022 Ben Compton made 878 first-class runs in the County Championship for Kent in April and May before scoring 158 runs (in two innings combined) in the last match before the end of May, a red-ball two-innings match for a "First Class Counties XI" (or "County Select XI") against the touring New Zealand cricket team. However, unlike in Hick's case in 1988, the tour match was not given first-class status as the sides used more that eleven players at different stages, so this is not recognised as 1,000 first-class runs before the end of May.

1,000 runs before the end of May

References

Further reading
 Cricket's most exclusive club, ESPNcricinfo, 5 May 2012
 Glenn Turner joins the elite, Wisden, 1974
 1000 runs before June
 Nick Compton's last chance to reach 1,000 runs by the end of May, The Guardian, 29 May 2012
 Nick Compton denied 1,000-run milestone by rain at Worcester, BBC Sport, 31 May 2012

First-class cricket records